Magic Tour Highlights is an EP by Bruce Springsteen and the E Street Band, which consists of four live audio tracks and their accompanying videos, and was released for digital download on July 15, 2008.  The performances were recorded during the 2008 Magic Tour, and feature guest musicians, as well as Danny Federici's last performance with the group.

The proceeds from the sales will support the Danny Federici Melanoma Fund.

Track listing
"Always a Friend" (Alejandro Escovedo, Chuck Prophet) (with Alejandro Escovedo) Recorded: April 14, 2008, Houston, Texas – 4:49
"The Ghost of Tom Joad" (Bruce Springsteen) (with Tom Morello) Recorded: April 7, 2008, Anaheim, California – 8:39
"Turn! Turn! Turn!" (Pete Seeger) (with Roger McGuinn) Recorded: April 23, 2008, Orlando, Florida – 4:09
"4th Of July, Asbury Park (Sandy)" (Bruce Springsteen) (Danny Federici's final performance with the E Street Band) Recorded: March 20, 2008, Indianapolis, Indiana – 7:07

Personnel
 Bruce Springsteen - guitar, vocals
 Roy Bittan – piano
 Clarence Clemons – saxophone, percussion
 Charlie Giordano – organ
 Nils Lofgren - guitar, backing vocals
 Garry Tallent - bass
 Soozie Tyrell - violin, backing vocals
 Steve Van Zandt - guitar, backing vocals
 Max Weinberg - drums
 Danny Federici - accordion
 Recording – John Cooper
 Mixing – Bob Clearmountain
 Mastering – Bob Ludwig
 Video Recording Director – Chris Hilson
 Video Editing – Thom Zinny
 Digital Booklet Design – Michelle Holme

References

2008 EPs
Bruce Springsteen video albums
Live EPs
Bruce Springsteen EPs
Bruce Springsteen live albums